This is a list of law enforcement agencies in Canada.

Federal

 Canada Border Services Agency
 Canadian Coast Guard
Canada Post Security & Investigation Services
Canada Revenue Agency Criminal Investigations Program
Canadian Food Inspection Agency Inspectors and Investigators
Canadian Forces Military Police
 Canadian Forces National Investigation Service
 Correctional Service of Canada
Environment Canada Environmental and Wildlife Enforcement Officers
Fisheries and Oceans Canada Fishery Officers
Health Canada Compliance and Enforcement Officers

National Battlefields Commission Battlefields Park Police
Parks Canada Agency Park Wardens
Royal Canadian Mounted Police
Transport Canada Inspectors

Railway (Federal)
 Canadian National Police Service
 Canadian Pacific Police Service
 VIA Rail Canada Police Service

Provincial and Territorial

Alberta

Provincial 
 Alberta Community Peace Officers
 Alberta Forestry, Parks and Tourism, Conservation Officers
 Alberta Correctional Services Division
 Alberta Environment and Parks - Environmental Protection Peace Officers
 Alberta Fish and Wildlife Officers
 Alberta Law Enforcement Response Teams (ALERT)
 Alberta Sheriffs Branch

Municipal 
 Calgary Police Service
 Camrose Police Service
 Edmonton Police Service
 Lacombe Police Service
 Lethbridge Police Service
 Medicine Hat Police Service
 Taber Police Service

British Columbia

Provincial 
 British Columbia Commercial Vehicle Safety and Enforcement
British Columbia Community Safety Unit
 British Columbia Conservation Officer Service
 British Columbia Correctional Service
 British Columbia Natural Resources Officers
 British Columbia Park Rangers
British Columbia Passenger Transportation Branch
 British Columbia Sheriff Service
 British Columbia Special Provincial Constables - Provincial Fraud Investigators
Combined Forces Special Enforcement Unit – British Columbia

Subprovincial 
Abbotsford Police Department
Central Saanich Police Service
 Delta Police Department
 Lower Mainland Integrated Road Safety Units
 Metro Vancouver Transit Police
 Nelson Police Department
 New Westminster Police Service
 Oak Bay Police Department
 Port Moody Police Department
 Surrey Police Service
 Vancouver Police Department
 Victoria Police Department
 West Vancouver Police Department

Manitoba

Provincial 
 Manitoba Conservation Officers Service
 Manitoba Sheriff Service
 Motor Carrier Enforcement
 Natural Resource Officer Service

Subprovincial 
 Altona Police Service
 Brandon Police Service
 Manitoba First Nations Police
 Morden Police Service
 RM of Cornwallis Police Service
 RM of Whitehead Police Service
 Rivers Police Service
 Sainte-Anne Police Department
 Springfield Police Service
 Victoria Beach Police
 Winkler Police Service
 Winnipeg Police Service

New Brunswick

Provincial 

 Department of Justice and Public Safety (JPS)
 Conservation Enforcement Unit
 Commercial Vehicle Enforcement Unit
 Off Road Vehicle Enforcement Unit
 Compliance Enforcement Unit
 New Brunswick Sheriff’s Service
 Correctional Services
 Coroner's Service

Municipal 
 Bathurst City Police Service
 Beresford, Nigadoo, Petit-Rocher and Pointe-Verte Regional Police Service (B.N.P.P. Regional Police Service)
 Edmundston Police Force
 Fredericton Police Force
 Grand Falls Police Force
 Kennebecasis Regional Police Force (formerly Rothesay Regional Police Force)
 Miramichi Police Force
 Saint John Police Force
 Woodstock Police Force

Newfoundland and Labrador

Provincial 

 Royal Newfoundland Constabulary
 High Sheriff of Newfoundland and Labrador

Subprovincial 
 St. John's Municipal Enforcement
 Gander Municipal Police
 Grand Falls-Windsor Municipal Police
 Memorial University: Campus Enforcement and Patrol (CEP)

Northwest Territories
 NWT Highway Patrol (Highway Transport Officer)
 NWT Renewable Resources Officer
 NWT Parks Officer
 Yellowknife Municipal Enforcement Division
 Inuvik Bylaw Enforcement
 Hay River Municipal Enforcement
 NWT Sheriff Service

Nova Scotia

Provincial 

 Nova Scotia Sheriff Service
 Nova Scotia Vehicle Transportation Inspection
 Nova Scotia Conservation Enforcement
Nova Scotia Farm Animal Health & Welfare
Nova Scotia Society for the Prevention of Cruelty to Animals
Child Welfare Services
Adult Protection Services

Subprovincial 
 Amherst Police Department
 Annapolis Royal Police Department
 Bridgewater Police Service
 Cape Breton Regional Police Department: Sydney
 Halifax Regional Police
 Kentville Police Service
 New Glasgow Regional Police: New Glasgow
 New Glasgow Regional Police: Trenton
 Stellarton Police Service
 Truro Police Service
 Westville Police Service

Nunavut

 Iqaluit Municipal Enforcement
 Nunavut Sheriff’s Office

Ontario

Provincial

 Niagara Parks Police
 Ontario Ministry of Environment Enforcement
 Ontario Ministry of Health and Long-Term Care, Tobacco Enforcement Officers (through Public Health Units)
 Ontario Ministry of Finance Enforcement
 Ontario Ministry of Natural Resources and Forestry, Conservation Officers & Provincial Park Wardens
 Ontario Ministry of Transportation/ Motor Carrier Enforcement
Ontario Provincial Police

Municipal 
 Aylmer Police
 Barrie Police Service
 Belleville Police Service
 Brantford Police Service
 Brockville Police Service
 Chatham-Kent Police Service
 Cobourg Police Service
 Cornwall Community Police Service
 Deep River Police Service
 Durham Regional Police Service
 Gananoque Police Service
 Greater Sudbury Police Service
 Guelph Police Service
 Halton Regional Police Service
 Hamilton Police Service
 Hanover Police Service
 Kawartha Lakes Police Service
 Kingston Police
 LaSalle Police Service
 London Police Service
 Niagara Regional Police Service
 North Bay Police Service
 Ottawa Police Service
 Owen Sound Police Service
 Peel Regional Police
 Peterborough Police Service
 Port Hope Police Service
 St. Thomas Police Service
 Sarnia Police Service
 Saugeen Shores Police Service
 Sault Ste. Marie Police Service
 Smiths Falls Police Service
 South Simcoe Police Service
 Stratford Police Service
 Strathroy-Caradoc Police Service
 Thunder Bay Police Service
 Timmins Police Service
 Toronto Police Service
 Waterloo Regional Police Service
 West Grey Police Service
 Windsor Police Service
 Woodstock Police Service
 York Regional Police

Transit 
 GO Transit Special Constables
 Toronto Transit Commission Transit Enforcement Unit
 OC Transpo Special Constables
 YRT Special Constable Services
 MiWay (Mississauga Transit) Enforcement Unit

Housing 
Toronto Community Housing Special Constables

Universities 
 University of Toronto Campus Safety
 Brock University Campus Security Services
 Carleton University Campus Safety Services
 Fanshawe College Campus Security Services
 McMaster University Security Services
 University of Western Ontario Campus Safety and Emergency Services
 University of Windsor Campus Community Police
 Wilfrid Laurier University Special Constable Service
 University of Waterloo Special Constable Service

Prince Edward Island

Provincial 

 Prince Edward Island Conservation Officers
 Prince Edward Island Department of Corrections
 Prince Edward Island Fire Marshals Office
Prince Edward Island Highway Safety
 Prince Edward Island Sheriff Services

Subprovincial 
 Charlottetown Police
 Summerside Police
 Kensington Police
 UPEI Campus Police

Quebec

Provincial 
 Sûreté du Québec
 Bureau des enquêtes indépendantes 
Constable spécial du gouvernement du Québec
 Service de la protection de la faune

Municipal 
 Service de police de la Ville de Montréal
 Service de police de la Ville de Québec
 Service de police de la Ville de Gatineau
 Service de police de la Ville de Laval
 Service de police de l'agglomération de Longueuil
 Service de police de la Ville de Blainville
 Service de police de Châteauguay
 Régie de police de Lac des Deux-Montagnes
 Service de police de l'Assomption/St-Sulpice
 Service de police de la Ville de Lévis
 Service de la sécurité publique Ville de Mascouche
 Service de police de Mercier
 Service de police de Mirabel
 Service de police de la MRC des Collines-de-l'Outaouais
 Service de sécurité publique de la Ville de Repentigny
 Régie intermunicipale de police Richelieu-Saint-Laurent
 Régie intermunicipale de police de Roussillon
 Service de sécurité publique de Saguenay
 Sécurité publique de Saint-Eustache
 Service de police de la Ville de Sherbrooke
 Service de police de Terrebonne
 Régie intermunicipale de police de Thérèse-de-Blainville
 Service de sécurité publique de Trois-Rivières
 Service de police de la Ville de Bromont
 Service de police de la Ville de Granby
 Régie de police de Memphrémagog
 Service de police de Saint-Jean-sur-Richelieu
 Service de police de la Ville de Saint-Jérôme
 Service de la Sûreté municipale de Thetford Mines
 Sûreté et contrôle de la société de transport de Montréal (Transit Security)
 Sûreté aéroportuaire de l'aéroport Montréal-Trudeau (Airport Patrol Officer)

Saskatchewan

Provincial 
 Saskatchewan Firearms Office
 Saskatchewan Vehicle Impoundment Against Sexual Exploitation (VISE)
 Saskatchewan Corrections
 Saskatchewan Marshals Service (SMS)
 Warrant Enforcement and Suppression Team (WEST)  
 Animal Protection Officers
 Provincial Protective Services Branch(PPS)
 Conservation Officers
 Saskatchewan Safer Communities and Neighbourhoods (SCAN)
 Saskatchewan Sheriff Service (court security and Prisoner Transport) 
 Saskatchewan Highway Patrol
 Wascana Park Community Safety Officers
 CBSA Saskatchewan Division Patrol 
(Note: As of April 2022, agencies with a * and some other unlisted agencies have been merged into the "Provincial Protective Services")

Municipal 
 Caronport Police Service
 Corman Park Police Service
 Dalmeny Police Service
 Estevan Police Service
 Luseland Police Service
 Moose Jaw Police Service
 Prince Albert Police Service
 Regina Police Service
 File Hills 1st Nations Police Service 
 Saskatoon Police Service
 University of Saskatchewan Department of Protective Services
 Vanscoy Police Service
 Weyburn Police Service
 North Battleford Community Safety Officers 
Yorkton Community Safety Officer

Yukon Territory

 Yukon Highway & Public Works - Carrier Compliance Division
 Yukon Sheriffs Office
 Yukon Conservation Officer Service

Indigenous police

Alberta
 Blood Tribe Police Service
 North Peace Tribal Police Service
 Lakeshore Regional Police Service
 Tsuu T'ina Nation Police Service

British Columbia
 Stl’atl’imx Tribal Police Service

Manitoba
 Manitoba First Nation Police Services - MFNPS (Formally: Dakota Ojibway Police Services - DOPS) serves the following areas:
- Long Plain First Nation, Sandy Bay First Nation, Swan Lake First Nation, Birdtail Sioux First Nation, Canupawakpa Dakota Nation, Roseau River Anishinabe First Nation, Waywayseecappo First Nation and Opaskwayak Cree Nation.

Visit website: Manitoba First Nation Police

New Brunswick
 Woodstock First Nation Police – Woodstock, New Brunswick

Ontario
 First Nations Police
 Six Nations Police Service - Oshweken
 Wikwemikong Tribal Police Service – Wikwemikong, Ontario
 Nishnawbe-Aski Police Service– Thunder Bay
 Treaty Three Police Service – Kenora, Ontario
 UCCM Anishnaabe Police Service – M'Chigeeng First Nation
 Anishinabek Police Service – Garden River
 Tyendinaga Mohawk Police – Shannonville, Ontario
 Akwesasne Mohawk Police Service – Akwesasne, Ontario
 Rama Police Service
 Lac Seul Police Service
 Walpole Island Police Service – Wallaceburg, Ontario

Quebec
 Cree Police Service
 Mistissini Cree Police
 Kahnawake Peace Keepers
 Kanesatake Mohawk Police
 Nunavik Police Service
 Whapmagoostui Police
 Long Point Police
 Naskapi Police Force
 Ouje-Bougoumou Cree Nation Police Service
 Essipit Police Service
 Uashat mak Maleotanam Public Security

Saskatchewan
 File Hill First Nations Police Service

Fictional
In various television and film media, producers may decide to utilise fictitious law enforcement agencies for the purpose of artistic license or copyright reasons.

Local
Algonquin Bay Police Department - police service in the CTV-Super Écran crime drama Cardinal, with jurisdiction in the fictional city of Algonquin Bay, Ontario. 
Little Big Bear Police Service - police service in the Sky Atlantic series Tin Star, covering the fictional town of Little Big Bear, Alberta. 
Metropolitan Law Enforcement - police service in the Global series Rookie Blue. The former is printed on the police force logo, however it is often referred to as the "Metropolitan Police" in show. The show is set in Toronto, but does not make overt references to the city until later seasons. The real life counterpart would be the Toronto Police Service.
Metropolitan Police - police service in the CTV series Flashpoint and CBC Television series Cracked. A generic fictionalised version of the Toronto Police Service, it is home to the Strategic Response Unit (itself based on the Emergency Task Force).
Regional Police - regional police service in the Showcase TV series Trailer Park Boys. The service is shown to have a Parking Enforcement Division additionally. It is a fictional/generic version of the Halifax Regional Police.
Reverie Ipowahtaman Police Service - aboriginal police service in the Sky Atlantic series Tin Star. It covers the fictional Ipowahtaman First Nations reserve in Reverie, northern Alberta. 
Service de Police de Grande Ourse (Great Bear Police Service) - the local police service in the 2004 Radio-Canada TV series Grande Ourse. It covers the fictional mining town of Grande Ourse (Great Bear) in northern Quebec. 
 Service de Police Métropolitain (Metropolitan Police Service) - police service used in the 1998 Radio-Canada TV series Caserne 24, the 2011 Radio-Canada and 2014 Bravo-CTV series 19-2. In Caserne 24 it is the generic police service for the unnamed city the show is set in. In both versions of 19-2 it is a fictitious, generic version of the Service de police de la Ville de Montréal, with the uniforms and police vehicles bearing strong resemblance to the real Montreal.
Municipal Police Service - the police service covering Dog River, Saskatchewan, the fictional town in the CTV series Corner Gas. Generally just a two person police force, who do mostly Traffic Work. The Police Agency that would actually patrol the area would be the Royal Canadian Mounted Police .

Provincial
 Securite du Quebec - the provincial police service mentioned in the Radio-Canada and Bravo series 19-2. It is a fictional version of the Sûreté du Québec.
 Sûreté Nationale du Québec - the provincial police service in the 1996 Radio-Canada TV series Omerta. It is a fictional version of the Sûreté du Québec.

Federal
Immigration and Customs Security (Sécurité de l'immigration et des douanes) - the federal agency that is the main focus of the CBC television series The Border. Created to deal with trans-border matters including terrorism and smuggling, it operates under the supervision of Public Safety Canada. Throughout the series the agency liaises with both the Department of Homeland Security and MI6.
Royal Canadian Federal Police, RCFP (Gendarmerie Royale Fédérale du Canada, GRFC) - national police service Sky Atlantic series Tin Star. Officers wear tan pants with a blue stripe, dark blue shirts with the service patch on either shoulder and black bulletproof vests with POLICE emblazoned on the front. It is a fictional version of the Royal Canadian Mounted Police.
Canada Border Patrol, CBP (Patrouille Frontalière Canadienne, PFC) - national border services agency featured in the Sky Atlantic series Tin Star. It is a fictional version of, and has similar uniforms to the Canada Border Services Agency.

See also 

 Canadian Association of Police Governance
Crime in Canada

Interpol
 Law enforcement by country
Law enforcement in Canada
 List of countries by size of police forces
 Terrorism in Canada

References

External links 

Law enforcement agencies
Law enforcement agencies
Canada